Bally may refer to:

Places
Bally, a historical spelling of Bali
Bally (from the Irish baile) or townland, a traditional division of land, as well as a common prefix in the names of settlements throughout Ireland
Bally, Bally-Jagachha, a census town in Howrah district, West Bengal, India
Bally, Howrah, a city in Howrah district, West Bengal, India
Bally, Pennsylvania, a borough in the U.S.
Bally Creek, a stream in Minnesota
Bally Jagachha, a community development block in Howrah district, West Bengal, India

People
Albert W. Bally (fl. 1988), American geologist
Charles Bally (1865–1947), Swiss linguist
Étienne Bally (1923–2018), French sprinter
Elena Baltacha (born 1983), British tennis player nicknamed Bally
Bally Sagoo (born 1971), British-Indian singer and DJ
Ralph Sharman (1895-1918), professional baseball player nicknamed Bally

Companies
Bally (fashion house), Swiss fashion house founded in 1851
Bally Manufacturing, later known as Bally Entertainment, a defunct pinball manufacturer and casino company
Bally Midway, a defunct video game publisher once owned by Bally Manufacturing
Bally Total Fitness, a defunct American fitness club chain once owned by Bally Manufacturing
Bally Technologies, a gaming company, successor of Bally Manufacturing
Bally's Corporation, a casino company and current owner of the casino brand
For hotels and casinos named "Bally's", see Bally's Corporation#Properties
Bally Sports, a group of regional sports networks formerly known as Fox Sports Networks

Other uses
Bally (Vidhan Sabha constituency), electoral constituency in Howrah district, India
Bally, a British minced oath meaning "bloody"

See also
 Baly (disambiguation)